Aphra flavicosta is a moth of the subfamily Arctiinae. It was described by Gottlieb August Wilhelm Herrich-Schäffer in 1855. It found in Argentina.

References

Moths described in 1855
Arctiinae
Moths of South America